The Blue Parrot is a low budget 1953 British crime film directed by John Harlow and starring Dermot Walsh, Jacqueline Hill, Ballard Berkeley, Richard Pearson, and John Le Mesurier. The film was produced by Stanley Haynes for Act Films Ltd. Jacqueline Hill later became well known for playing Barbara, one of the original companions of BBC TV's Doctor Who. Ballard Berkeley found fame in later life playing Major Gowen in Fawlty Towers.

British crime reporter Percy Hoskins provided the story.

Premise
Soho night club the Blue Parrot is at the centre of murder  and racketeering investigations, and the police go undercover.

Cast
 Dermot Walsh as Bob Herrick 
 Jacqueline Hill as Maureen Maguire 
 Ballard Berkeley as Superintendent Chester 
 June Ashley as Gloria 
 Richard Pearson as "Quinny" 
 Ferdy Mayne as Stevens 
 Victor Lucas as Rocks Owen 
 Edwin Richfield as Taps Campelli
 John Le Mesurier as Henry Carson
 Arthur Rigby as Charlie 
 Valerie White as Eva West 
 Diane Watts as Carla

Critical reception
Radio Times wrote, "Dermot Walsh does his best with some lacklustre material, and John Le Mesurier turns up in a supporting slot, but there's little else here to recommend."
Britmovie wrote, "The Blue Parrot is a middling b-movie thriller set against the post-war backdrop of spivs, black-marketeers, pawnbrokers and raincoat detectives."
Sky Movies noted, "a real treat for connoisseurs of British B-movies of the post-war decade...Complete with such familiar elements of the genre as the raincoated detective (Dermot Walsh in a part that sounds as though it may have originally been written for a visiting American star) and settings at a nightclub and at Scotland Yard. Ferdy Mayne is on hand, as he was so often in these films, to supply smooth Continental villainy, and the film's major surprise lies in the casting of John Le Mesurier as the nightclub's shady owner."

References

External links

1953 films
British crime thriller films
British detective films
Police detective films
Films directed by John Harlow
Films set in London
1950s crime thriller films
British black-and-white films
1950s English-language films
1950s British films